Sainte-Foy-lès-Lyon (literally Sainte-Foy near Lyon) is a commune in the Metropolis of Lyon in Auvergne-Rhône-Alpes region in eastern France.

Geography 
It is a suburb of the city of Lyon, located to the west of the city.

It is located only  from the center of Lyon, but is a community in its own right. The town grew as a haven from the industry of Lyon, as it is set high above the city, and there are some panoramas of Lyon and the surrounding area, notably from a park known as the 'Esplanade de Lichfield'.

Lyon is said to be the city of three rivers – the Rhône and Saône rivers which converge there – and the Beaujolais wine. Sainte Foy's finest historic asset is remains of a Roman aqueduct and there is a fine seminary, steep narrow walled streets, parks and gardens, and squares in the town center.

Population

Education

International School of Lyon is located in the city of Sainte-Foy-lès-Lyon.

Twin towns
Sainte-Foy-lès-Lyon is twinned with
 Lichfield, Staffordshire, England.
 Kraljevo, Serbia
 Limburg an der Lahn, Germany

Notable people 
 Antoine Cariot (1820–1883), priest and botanist, died in Sainte-Foy-lès-Lyon
 Alexis Carrel (1873–1944), surgeon, biologist and eugenicist, who was awarded the Nobel Prize in Physiology or Medicine in 1912
 Éric-Emmanuel Schmitt (born 1960), novelist and playwright
 Isabelle Patissier (born 1967), world champion rock climber and rally driver
 Frédéric Kanouté (born 1977), Malian-French footballer
 Florian Maurice (born 1974), French footballer

See also
Communes of the Metropolis of Lyon

References

External links

 Official website

Communes of Lyon Metropolis
Lyonnais